Edgbaston Cricket Ground (also known as Edgbaston Stadium) is a cricket venue in the Edgbaston area of Birmingham, England. It is home to Warwickshire County Cricket Club, and is also used for Test matches and One Day Internationals.

Edgbaston hosted its first Test match in 1902. It was during this match that Johnny Tyldesley became the first player to score a Test century at the ground. Alastair Cook's score of 294, which was achieved in 2011 against India, is the highest Test score seen at the ground. The South African Graeme Smith holds the record for highest score by an overseas player with 277.

26 One Day International centuries have been scored at the ground. The highest of these was 171 not out, which was made in 1975 by the New Zealand player Glenn Turner.

, no player from Warwickshire has scored a Test century at Edgbaston.

Key
 * denotes that the batsman was not out.
 Inns. denotes the number of the innings in the match.
 Balls denotes the number of balls faced in an innings.
 NR denotes that the number of balls was not recorded.
 Parentheses next to the player's score denotes his century number at Edgbaston.
 The column title Date refers to the date the match started.
 The column title Result refers to whether the player's team won lost or if the match was drawn.

Test centuries

The following table summarises the Test centuries scored at Edgbaston.

One Day International centuries

The following table summarises the One Day International centuries scored at Edgbaston.

Women's Test centuries
The following table summarises the women's Test centuries scored at Edgbaston.

References

External links
Official web page

Edgbaston
Cricket grounds in the West Midlands (county)
Centuries
Sport in Birmingham, West Midlands